Ray Miller may refer to:

Ray Miller (baseball manager) (1945–2021), player, manager and coach in Major League Baseball
Ray Miller (first baseman) (1888–1927), infielder in Major League Baseball
Ray Miller (Ohio legislator) (born 1949), former Democratic member of the Ohio Senate and the Ohio House of Representatives
Ray Miller (bandleader) (1896–1974), American bandleader in the 1920s
Ray T. Miller (1893–1966), Ohio politician; mayor of Cleveland, Ohio; chairman of the Cuyahoga County Democratic Party
Ray Miller (actor), actor in Daredevils of the Red Circle
 (born 1941), German singer

See also